Dmytro Oleksiyovych Kara-Mustafa (born 30 October 1972) is a Ukrainian retired professional footballer who played as a midfielder and current assistant coach at Kryvbas Kryvyi Rih.

Honours

Player
Metalurh Mariupol
 Ukrainian Second League, Group B: 1995–96

Shakhtar Sverdlovsk
 Luhansk Oblast Championship: 1998, 2002; runner-up: 2004
 Luhansk Oblast Cup: 2004

Manager
Shakhtar Sverdlovsk
 Ukrainian Amateur League: 2006
 Luhansk Oblast Championship: 2005, 2006; runner-up: 2004
 Luhansk Oblast Cup: 2005

References

External links
 
 

1972 births
Living people
People from Krasnodon
Soviet footballers
Ukrainian footballers
Association football midfielders
FC Zorya Luhansk players
FC Shakhtar Sverdlovsk players
FC Dynamo Luhansk players
FC Mariupol players
FC Burevestnik-YuRGUES Shakhty players
Soviet Second League players
Ukrainian Premier League players
Ukrainian First League players
Ukrainian Second League players
Ukrainian Amateur Football Championship players
Russian Second League players
Ukrainian football managers
FC Shakhtar Sverdlovsk managers
SC Olkom Melitopol managers
Ukrainian Second League managers
Ukrainian expatriate footballers
Expatriate footballers in Russia
Ukrainian expatriate sportspeople in Russia
Ukrainian expatriate football managers
Expatriate football managers in Belarus
Ukrainian expatriate sportspeople in Belarus
Expatriate football managers in Moldova
Ukrainian expatriate sportspeople in Moldova